Valeria Aparecida Bonifacio (born 9 March 1968) commonly known as Valeria is a Brazilian footballer who played as a midfielder for the Brazil women's national football team. She was part of the team at the 1995 FIFA Women's World Cup and 1999 FIFA Women's World Cup. At the club level, she played for Lusa Sant'Anna in Brazil.

References

External links
 
 

1968 births
Living people
Brazilian women's footballers
Brazil women's international footballers
Place of birth missing (living people)
1995 FIFA Women's World Cup players
1999 FIFA Women's World Cup players
Women's association football midfielders